Ovaköy can refer to:

 Ovaköy, Köşk
 Ovaköy, Pasinler